The 1979 Women's World Open Squash Championship was the women's edition of the 1979 World Open, which serves as the individual world championship for squash players. The event took place in Sheffield in England during 6–12 March 1979. Heather McKay won the World Open title, defeating Sue Cogswell in the final.

Seeds

First round

Draw and results

Notes
This tournament was officially the first World Open but there was a significant unofficial invitation event held in 1976.

See also
World Open
1979 Men's World Open Squash Championship

References

External links
Women's World Open

1979 in squash
World Squash Championships
Squash tournaments in the United Kingdom
1979 in English sport
1979 in women's squash
International sports competitions hosted by England